This is a list of Ecuadorian Ironman who have participated and finished the full Ironman distance competitions around the world.

Roman Bravo has the best finished time of all the Ecuadorian participants in the Ironman Triathlon. His finished time at the Cozumel Ironman in 2021 was 8:29:05.  Nelson Vásquez was the first Ecuadorian to become an Ironman in Switzerland in 1999, with an official time of 11:42:57.

Men's Division

Women's Division

References

Ironmen
List